Vieux-Arbres Ecological Reserve is an ecological reserve in Quebec, Canada. It was established May 27, 1992.

References

External links
 Official website from Government of Québec

Protected areas of Abitibi-Témiscamingue
Nature reserves in Quebec
Protected areas established in 1992
1992 establishments in Quebec